Robert William Forden is an American diplomat who served as the United States' Chargé d'affaires to China from 2020 to 2021. He previously served as the deputy chief of mission to the American Institute in Taiwan and the deputy chief of mission to the Embassy of the United States in Beijing. He is the current nominee to be the next United States Ambassador to Cambodia.

Early life and education
Forden was born in Southern California in August 1959. He earned a Bachelor of Arts in politics from the University of California, Santa Cruz, and a postgraduate degree from the Fletcher School of Law and Diplomacy in international trade and Asian diplomatic history.

Career
Forden's experience in China stems from his time teaching English at universities in Shenyang and Beijing from 1981 to 1983. He has held a variety of diplomatic posts throughout his career, beginning with positions as an economic officer at the Embassy of the United States in Tel Aviv and Embassy of the United States in Hanoi. While in Hanoi, he worked to complete and implement a trade agreement between the United States and Vietnam. Forden served two stints at the U.S. Embassy in Beijing prior to his service as chargé d'affaires, from 1995 to 1998 and then again from 2007 to 2011.

In 2002, Forden took a position as the head of mission at the American Institute in Taiwan Kaohsiung Branch Office, where he served until 2005. He subsequently served as the deputy director of the State Department's China and Mongolia Affairs Office from 2005 to 2007. In 2015, Forden was named the 15th deputy director of the American Institute in Taiwan, a position he held until 2018.

Forden returned to Beijing in 2018 to serve as the United States' deputy chief of mission to China. In 2020, Terry Branstad, the United States ambassador to China, was asked to step down by President Donald Trump, so that Branstad could assist with Trump's presidential campaign. To replace him, Forden was appointed to the post of Chargé d'affaires, where he currently serves.

Ambassador to Cambodia
On June 22, 2022, President Joe Biden nominated Forden to be the next ambassador to Cambodia. His nomination was returned to Biden on January 3, 2023, as no action was taken on it for the rest of the year.

President Biden renominated Forden the same day. His nomination is pending before the Senate Foreign Relations Committee.

Personal life
Forden is married to Hui-chuan Chi, a native of Kaohsiung, Taiwan. They have three children. He speaks Mandarin Chinese and Vietnamese.

References

Living people
1959 births
20th-century American diplomats
21st-century American diplomats
United States Department of State officials
Ambassadors of the United States to China
Deputy Directors of the American Institute in Taiwan
Kaohsiung Branch Chiefs of the American Institute in Taiwan
University of California, Santa Cruz alumni
The Fletcher School at Tufts University alumni
People from California
Date of birth missing (living people)